Preston Park railway station is on the Brighton Main Line in England, serving Preston Village and the northern suburban areas of the city of Brighton and Hove, East Sussex.

The station is managed by Southern, which is one of two companies that serve the station, alongside Thameslink. Between 2008 and 2018, Gatwick Express also served Preston Park with a limited number of services at peak times only; these services were withdrawn as part of the May 2018 timetable change.

History
The London Brighton and South Coast Railway opened a new station named Preston, on 1 November 1869 to serve the growing parish of Preston, then north of the Brighton boundary. The station was enlarged and remodelled to its present design in 1879 during the construction of the Cliftonville Curve spur line from the main line to Hove and the West Sussex coast line. The station was then renamed Preston Park although the nearby Preston Park did not exist until 1883.

In 1881 the railway murderer Percy Lefroy Mapleton alighted at the station after having killed Isaac Frederick Gold and dumped his body in Balcombe tunnel.

Facilities
The station has a pair of island platforms, linked by a subway; only three platform faces are now in operation. The three tracks through the station reduce to two before traversing Patcham Tunnel, almost two miles (3.2 km) further north.

Brighton & Hove Albion Football Club's former home, Withdean Stadium is located a short walk from the station, and for this reason, during its tenancy of the stadium, the club offered free travel vouchers with its match tickets — allowing fans to travel from Brighton to Preston Park without there being an apparent surcharge of the train fare.

Services 
Off-peak, services at Preston Park are operated by Southern and Thameslink using  and  EMUs.

The typical off-peak service in trains per hour is:
 2 tph to  via 
 2 tph to 
 2 tph to 
 2 tph to  via 

During the peak hours and on Saturdays, the service between London Victoria and Littlehampton is increased to 2 tph.

In addition, the station is served by a number of peak hour Gatwick Express services which usually pass through Preston Park.

See also 

 Brighton railway station
 Transport in Brighton and Hove

References

External links 

Railway stations in Brighton and Hove
Former London, Brighton and South Coast Railway stations
DfT Category D stations
Railway stations in Great Britain opened in 1869
Railway stations served by Govia Thameslink Railway
1869 establishments in England